Hakea maconochieana is a shrub in the family Proteacea and is endemic to Queensland Australia. It is a rare species with red flowers, needle-like leaves and an upright or spreading shrub.

Description
The branchlets at flowering are sparsely covered with flattened silky hairs. The pedicel has few or moderately covered with soft hairs. Flowering occurs may occur from April to August with the main flush in September.

Taxonomy and naming
The species was first formally described by the botanist Laurence Haegi in 1999 as part of the work Appendix: Hakea written by Haegi, W.R.Barker, R.M.Barker, and A.J.Wilson as published in Flora of Australia. The specific epithet honours John Maconochie who was the botanist in charge of the Alice Springs Herbarium from 1967 to 1984 who had a keen interest in Hakeas.

Distribution and habitat
It is endemic to several isolated areas in far South West region of Queensland. It was originally known from scattered localities in the Ambathala Range in the Mariala National Park near Adavale. It generally grows in stony clay soil in scattered open Acacia stowardii communities.

Conservation status
Hakea maconochieana is classified as vulnerable under Queensland's Nature Conservation (Wildlife) Regulation 2006.

References

maconochieana
Flora of Queensland